CA4 may refer to:

 Carbonic anhydrase 4, an enzyme that in humans is encoded by the CA4 gene
 Cornu Ammonis region 4, a region of the hippocampus

CA-4 may refer to:
 CAC CA-4, a 1941 Australian bomber aircraft
 USS Pittsburgh (CA-4), a 1901 United States Navy armored cruiser
 California's 4th congressional district
 California State Route 4
 Central America-4 Border Control Agreement, a boundary treaty between Guatemala, El Salvador, Honduras, and Nicaragua
 Combretastatin A-4, a natural polyphenol

Ca4 may refer to:
 Ca4 line, a regional Catalonia railway line connecting Barcelona and Lleida-Pirineus

Ca4 may refer to:
 4 atoms of Calcium

Ca.4 may refer to:
 Caproni Ca.4, an Italian heavy bomber of the World War I era